The 1900 Miami Redskins football team was an American football team that represented Miami University during the 1900 college football season. Under new head coach Alonzo Edwin Branch, Miami compiled a 0–4 record.

Schedule

Notes

References

Miami
Miami RedHawks football seasons
College football winless seasons
Miami Redskins football